The Gardens is a rural locality in the local government area of Break O'Day in the North-east region of Tasmania. The 2016 census determined a population of 19 for the state suburb of The Gardens.

History
The Gardens was gazetted as a locality in 1961.

Geography
The Tasman Sea forms the eastern boundary.

Road infrastructure
The C848 route (Gardens Road) enters from the south-east and ends at the village.

References

Localities of Break O'Day Council
Towns in Tasmania